is a former Japanese football player. He played for Japan national team.

Club career
Horiike was educated at, and played for, Shimizu Higashi High School. He won the national high school championship with his teammates, including Katsumi Oenoki and Kenta Hasegawa. He continued his study and football at Juntendo University.

After graduating in 1988, he joined the Japan Soccer League team of Yomiuri. He played as a defensive midfielder, then as centre back, partnered with Hisashi Kato.  When Japan's first professional league, the J1 League, started, Shimizu S-Pulse was founded in his local city. He joined the club in 1992 and re-united with his high school teammates Oenoki and Hasegawa. His position was a right full back. After the end of the inaugural season, he was chosen as a member of the Best Eleven in 1993.

He was transferred to Cerezo Osaka in 1998 and came back to Shimizu briefly in 1999 before resigning.

National team career
Horiike was capped 58 times and scored 2 goals for the Japanese national team between 1986 and 1995. He made his international debut on 1 August 1986 in a friendly against Malaysia while he was still a university student. He was mainly a right full back for the national team. He was a member of the Japan team that won the 1992 Asian Cup and he played 4 matches in the competition. Under national coach Hans Ooft, Japan progressed to the Final round at 1994 World Cup qualification. Horiike was on the pitch when Japan's hope to play in the finals was dashed by an injury-time Iraqi equaliser in the last qualifier, the match that the Japanese fans now refer to as the Agony of Doha.

He is currently working as a soccer commentator on television.

Club statistics

National team statistics

Honors and awards

Individual honors
 J.League Best Eleven: 1993

Team honors
 1992 Asian Cup (Champions)

References

External links

 
 Japan National Football Team Database
 

1965 births
Living people
Juntendo University alumni
Association football people from Shizuoka Prefecture
Japanese footballers
Japan international footballers
Japan Soccer League players
J1 League players
Tokyo Verdy players
Shimizu S-Pulse players
Cerezo Osaka players
1988 AFC Asian Cup players
1992 AFC Asian Cup players
1995 King Fahd Cup players
AFC Asian Cup-winning players
Footballers at the 1986 Asian Games
Footballers at the 1990 Asian Games
Association football defenders
Asian Games competitors for Japan